Volaré! The Very Best of the Gipsy Kings is a compilation album by the French Rumba Catalana band Gipsy Kings, which was released in 1999 in Europe, Japan and Mexico. The US version released in 2000 is identical with the omission of "Hitmix '99 (Radio Edit)" which appear as track #20 on the first CD1 of the other versions.

"Pida Me La" previously only appeared on the European compilation album Greatest Hits. Also, "Sin Ella", "La Dona" and "Quiero Saber" are slightly different remastered versions of their Live album.

"Oh Èh Oh Èh" was first released on 1998 compilation "Allez! Ola! Olé! (El Album Oficial De La Copa Del Mundo)".
"I've Got No Strings" comes from the 1991 compilation to Disney's project Simply Mad About The Mouse.
Gipsy Kings's spanish remix of "Hotel California" was first released on the 1990 compilation "Rubáiyát: Elektra's 40th Anniversary".

Track listing

Charts

Certifications

References

External links
Volare! The Very Best Of The Gipsy Kings at Discogs
 "Volare! The Very Best Of The Gipsy Kings" at Amazon

1999 greatest hits albums
Gipsy Kings compilation albums
Spanish-language compilation albums